Phil Mulloy (born 29 August 1948) is an Irish-English animator.  He was born in Wallasey, Merseyside and studied both painting and filmmaking. Mulloy worked as a screenwriter and director of live-action films until the late 1980s before becoming an animator. His animations have been described as "satirical grotesque" and often portray the dark side of human nature and contemporary social, political, and religious values in a humorous and at times, shocking way. His visual style is distinctive in its use of primitive, often skeletal figures and minimalist backgrounds. Mulloy has made over 30 animated films many of which are in themed groupings based on Hollywood genres. Mulloy has won many international awards for his work and has conducted several workshops for young animators.

Early life
Mulloy was born in Wallasey to an Irish father, Michael Mulloy, who migrated to Liverpool to work on the docks and an English mother named Elizabeth.

Education
Mulloy studied painting at Ravensbourne College followed by film at the Royal College of Art graduating in 1973.

Career

Early work

Mulloy's 1982 drama film Mark Gertler: Fragments of a Biography won the 
British Film Institute's Grierson Award.

MTV Idents
Mulloy created many of MTV's iconic idents during the 1980s and 90s. These included the much lauded Boxers to Lovers in which two boxers, depicted as crude stick figures, stop fighting and embrace one another, only to find themselves engulfed by the furious crowd of spectators baying for blood.

Cowboys
Mulloy produced the Cowboys series in 1991 with funding from Channel Four and the Arts Council. The series consists of six 3-minute-long films on 35 mm: Slim Pickin's, That's Nothin''', Murder!, High Noon, The Conformist and Outrage. The shorts brought Mulloy to the attention of audiences in the UK and internationally.

Mulloy exploits many of the clichés of the Western genre, minimalist Saguaro cactus dotted wilderness, stock characters like the Stetson wearing semi-nomadic wanderer, horses, lynchings and so forth drawn using brush and black ink in an intentionally primitive, silhouetted style to portray male violence, greed and rivalry using absurd black comedy.

Mulloy, commenting on his creative approach said:“The audience is familiar with genres and clichés, and I take advantage of that fact. The viewers soon discover their position in the usual scheme of things, and become conscious of their role.”Music for the films was provided by Alexander Bălănescu and Keith Tippett.

The Ten Commandments
Mulloy created The Ten Commandments series between 1994 and 1996. The series consists of ten short 35 mm films based on each of the ten commandments of Judeo-Christian tradition: Thou Shalt Not Adore False Gods, Thou Shalt Not Commit Blasphemy, Remember to Keep Holy the Sabbath Day, Honour Thy Father and Thy Mother, Thou Shalt Not Kill, Thou Shalt Not Commit Adultery, Thou Shalt Not Steal, Thou Shalt Not Bear False Witness, Thou Shalt Not Covet Thy Neighbours Goods and Thou Shalt Not Covet Thy Neighbours Wife.

The animations, created using brush and black ink on white paper in Mulloy's characteristic satirical grotesque style, employ black humour throughout.

Mulloy, commenting on the series in 2006, said:"I had a structure I could work within and a set of ideas I could reinterpret for myself. Similarly reworking and playing with narrative structures creates ways of reinterpreting elements to do with my own thinking about and experiencing of the world.”The series won the Jury Award in Vila do Conde and a Special Award in Hiroshima.

The ChainThe Chain was produced in 1998 for Channel Four and was one of 30 animated short films by 30 internationally acclaimed animators who participated in the '30/30' Human Rights Animation Project to highlight the 30 articles of the Universal Declaration of Human Rights. The title of this dark satire refers to the catastrophic chain reaction that follows the cruel treatment of a child whose drawing is thrown away. The 10-minute-long 35 mm film won the Jury Award at the Vila do Conde International Short Film Festival and the Critics Award at the World Festival of Animated Films in Zagreb.

Season's Greetings
Mulloy created Season's Greetings in 1999 for Animate Projects with funding from Channel Four and the Arts Council. The three-minute film mixes live-action and animation to produce "A greetings card for the new millennium".

Intolerance I – III

The Christies
Mulloy created The Christies series in 2006 for Spectre Films. The series consists of twelve short films: Introduction, Family Values, The Language of Love, Tracey's Dream, The House Painter, A Song For Buster, The Confession, Natural Disaster, Mr. Yakamoto, Gary Challenger, Mr. Christie's Sex Manual, and The Day The Earth Moved.

Mulloy produced the animated films on computer using the Buahaus Mirage 1.5 package.

The series won the Mercury Filmworks Prize For Animated Feature in Ottawa, 2006.

Current work
At present Mulloy is working on a trilogy based on the Christie family. Part 1, Goodbye Mister Christie, was completed in 2011. Part 2, Dead but not Buried, was completed in summer 2012 and won first prize at the Ottawa Animation festival. In 2013 he released Part 3, The Pain and The Pity. His short film Endgame'' won Grand Prix for the best short at the 2016 edition of World Festival of Animated Film - Animafest Zagreb.

Personal life
His wife is the filmmaker Vera Neubauer, his son is director and screenwriter Daniel Mulloy and his daughter is the Student Academy Award-nominated director Lucy Mulloy.

References

External links 
philmulloy.tv Phil Mulloy’s Official Site
 philmulloy.com Phil Mulloy’s Former Official Site
Season's Greetings Animate Projects
Podcast of an interview by Frames Per Second Magazine

British animators
British animated film directors
British satirists
British people of Irish descent
People from Wallasey
Alumni of the Royal College of Art
Living people
1948 births